Neptidopsis ophione, the scalloped false sailer or scalloped sailer (also spelled "sailor"), is a butterfly in the family Nymphalidae. It is found in Guinea, Sierra Leone, Liberia, Ivory Coast, Ghana, Togo, Benin, Nigeria, Cameroon, Equatorial Guinea, Gabon, the Republic of the Congo, Angola, the Democratic Republic of the Congo, Uganda, Sudan, Ethiopia, Kenya, Tanzania, Malawi, Zambia, Mozambique and Zimbabwe. The habitat consists of forest edges, secondary forest and dense woodland.

Adults are attracted to fermented bananas and sap exuding from the branches of trees and shrubs. They are on wing from January to September.

The larvae feed on Tragia species T. benthami, T. brevipes, T. impedita and probably also Ricinus species.

Subspecies
Neptidopsis ophione ophione — Guinea, Sierra Leone, Liberia, Ivory Coast, Ghana, Togo, Benin, Nigeria: south and the Cross River loop, Cameroon, Bioko, Gabon, Congo
Neptidopsis ophione nucleata Grünberg, 1911 — northern Angola, Democratic Republic of the Congo, Uganda, southern Sudan, Ethiopia, Kenya, Tanzania, Malawi, Zambia, Mozambique, eastern Zimbabwe

References

Seitz, A. Die Gross-Schmetterlinge der Erde 13: Die Afrikanischen Tagfalter. Plate XIII 49 d velleda

Butterflies described in 1777
Biblidinae